James Joseph Woulfe (November 25, 1859 – December 20, 1924) was an American professional baseball player. He played one season in Major League Baseball for the 1884 Cincinnati Red Stockings and Pittsburgh Alleghenys, primarily as an outfielder.

External links

Major League Baseball outfielders
Cincinnati Red Stockings (AA) players
Pittsburgh Alleghenys players
Robert E. Lee's players
Baseball players from Louisiana
19th-century baseball players
1859 births
1924 deaths